Stanley F.C. may refer to:

Accrington Stanley F.C., an English association football club from Lancashire
Accrington Stanley F.C. (1891), a defunct English association football club from Lancashire 
Stanley F.C. (Liverpool), an English association football team from the 1880s
Stanley F.C. (Perthshire), a Scottish association football team which existed from 1890 to 1950
Falkland Islands official football team, nicknamed Stanley, an association football team from the Falkland Islands